Dispatch or dispatches may refer to:

Arts, media and entertainment

Newspapers
 The Columbus Dispatch, daily newspaper of Columbus, Ohio
 Daily Dispatch, a South African newspaper
 The Dispatch / The Rock Island Argus, daily newspaper of East Moline, Illinois
 St. Louis Post-Dispatch, daily newspaper of St. Louis, Missouri
 Richmond Times-Dispatch, daily newspaper of Richmond, Virginia
 Alaska Dispatch News, daily newspaper of Anchorage, Alaska
 Observer-Dispatch, daily newspaper of Utica, New York

Radio and television
 Dispatches (radio program), a Canadian radio program aired on CBC Radio One
 Dispatches (TV programme) (since 1987), a British documentary show broadcast on Channel 4
 Dispatches from Elsewhere, an American drama television series

Bands
 Dispatch (band), an American jam band
 Dispatch (EP), their 2011 extended-play release
 Dispatched, a Swedish death-metal band

Other
 Dispatches (book), a 1977 book by Michael Herr about the Vietnam War
 Dispatches (magazine), a defunct 2008 political magazine 
 The Dispatch, a political online magazine
 Dispatch News Service, a news agency

Vehicles
 Citroën Dispatch, a small van
 Dispatch (sternwheeler), an early 20th century steamboat in Oregon, US
 Dispatcher Jeep, a postal Jeep used by the US Postal Service; see List of Jeep vehicles#DJ

Other uses
 Dispatch, Kansas, an unincorporated community in the US
 Dispatch (logistics), a procedure in logistics
 Dynamic dispatch, a computer-programming technique
 Dispatched labor, an employment relationship
 Dispatcher, communications personnel
 Instruction dispatch, in a CPU

See also
 
 Despatch (disambiguation)
 The Dispatch (disambiguation)
 Mentioned in dispatches, an official military recognition (in various countries) for gallantry or commendable service